The 1978 Cincinnati Bearcats football team represented University of Cincinnati during 1978 NCAA Division I-A football season. The Bearcats, led by head coach Ralph Staub, participated as independent and played their home games at Nippert Stadium.

Schedule

References

Cincinnati
Cincinnati Bearcats football seasons
Cincinnati Bearcats football